This is a list of lighthouses in Cyprus, a large island which lies at the eastern end of the Mediterranean.  The list includes those located in the Republic of Cyprus, the occupied areas of Northern Cyprus and British Sovereign Base Areas. The numbers given are those from the Admiralty list of lights.

Lighthouses

Republic of Cyprus

Northern Cyprus

Akrotiri and Dhekelia

See also
 Lists of lighthouses and lightvessels

References

External links

 

Lists of lighthouses
Lighthouse
Lighthouses